The Ateliers et Chantiers de France (ACF, Workshops and Shipyards of France) was a major shipyard that was established in Dunkirk, France, in 1898.
The shipyard boomed in the period before World War I (1914–18), but struggled in the inter-war period. It was badly damaged during World War II (1939–45).
In the first thirty years after the war the shipyard again experienced a boom and employed up to 3,000 workers making oil tankers, and then liquid natural gas tankers.
Demand dropped off in the 1970s and 1980s.
In 1972 the shipyard became Chantiers de France-Dunkerque, and in 1983 merged with others yards to become part of Chantiers du Nord et de la Mediterranee, or Normed.
The shipyard closed in 1987.

Foundation (1898–99)

The Ateliers et Chantiers de France (ACF) company was officially founded on 6 July 1898 by a consortium of six shipping brokers, the Dunkirk chamber of commerce and the state.
The state asked that the shipyard be able to build steamships and also four-masted barques and clippers with metal hulls.
The state ceded the public land within the fortifications of Dunkirk to the east of the channel, and undertook levelling of the site and excavation of a launching basin.
The work proceeded smoothly.
The new facility was the first in France to power its machinery with electricity.

Pre-war (1899–1914)

The ACF was highly successful in its first few years.
One of the first directors was Florent Guillain.
The first ship was the Adolphe III, launched on 22 March 1902.
This was a four-master with a riveted hull intended for the Atlantic trade.
By this time the shipyard had 800–900 workers, including some from Saint-Nazaire and some from across the border in Belgium.
Apprentices were recruited for training at the age of 12.
The shipyard was busy in the period before World War I (1914–18) building trawlers, cargo chips and cruise boats.
The workforce rose to almost 1,900.
The first of ten passenger liners was the luxurious Asie, launched on 10 February 1914.

World War I (1914–18)
The ACF was less active during World War I since over 60% of the workers had been mobilized in the armed forces.
The shipyard concentrated on repair and renovation of warships and manufacture of weapons and ammunition.
In 1914 the Forges at Chantiers de France fitted armor on three cars at the request of a Royal Naval Air Service squadron in Dunkirk.
One of these, a 50 hp Rolls-Royce, was thus the first Rolls-Royce armored car.

Inter-war period (1918–39)

The 1920s were a difficult period, with only a slight improvement in the 1930s.
In 1924 the shipyard joined forces with the Société des Forges & Chantiers de la Méditerranée and the Société des Ateliers et Chantiers de St Nazaire to submit a joint bid to build submarines for Poland. They submitted a low bid, but due to lack of experience were not selected.
The ACF struggled against competition from other yards in France and abroad, and was affected by the depressed economy of the 1930s.
It was able to obtain orders from the Compagnie Générale Transatlantique and from the Dreyfus arms manufacturer.
Naval orders were important, including the destroyers Bourrasque, Adroit, Lion and Vauban as well as minesweepers and tankers.
The Émile-Miguet, launched in 1937, was the largest tanker in the world in its day.
The motor tanker of 14,115 tons, built for the Compagne Navale des Petroles, was sunk on 12 October 1939 by gunfire from German submarine U-48.

World War II (1939–45)

During World War II (1939–45) the shipyard was destroyed in 1940, rebuilt during the German occupation of France, then destroyed again.

Post-war boom (1945–77)
The ACF was rebuilt in 1947. The shipyard could accommodate ships of  length and 4,000 tonnes deadweight.
The shipyard experienced a boom for the next thirty years.
During this period the original quay was rebuilt and a second quay added.
The workshops were modernized to support welding and prefabrication.
The shipyard received financial support from the state, which became its largest creditor.
The AP2 contained two 30-ton cranes to handle prefabricated welded hull components.

The ACF employed about 3,000 people in 1950.
In 1948–52 the shipyard built the liners Flandre, Calédonien and Cambodge for the Compagnie des Messageries Maritimes.
It moved into construction of large oil tankers, as well as bulk carriers of ore and other products.
Tankers of 34,000 tonnes were built for an American oil company.
In 1960 the Schneider group took a major stake in the enterprise, and in following years rationalized production in Dunkirk with operations at other sites.

On 30 November 1960 the yard became part of the Ateliers et Chantiers de Dunkerque-Bordeaux (ACDB). Almost all the investment by Schneider and the state went into the Dunkirk operation rather than Bordeaux.

The shipyard started making specialized vessels including "ship garages" or rouliers, refrigerated ships and liquefied natural gas (LNG) carriers. 
The last passenger liner, the Pasteur, was launched on 2 June 1966.
At the end of 1967 Schneider split up the ACDB.
In 1972 the yard became Chantiers de France-Dunkerque.
In 1974–81 the shipyard employed 3,000 workers and staff to design and build seven  LNG carriers.

Last years (1977–88)

In September 1977 as part of a government rescue package the shipyard merged with the Société métallurgique et navale (SMN) to become the shipping branch of the Société métallurgique et navale Dunkerque-Normandie (SMNDN), a subsidiary of the Empain-Schneider group.
That year it was forced to lay off workers due to the petrol crisis.
Activity declined further in the 1980s, although two car ferries were built for Stena Line.
In 1983 the shipyard merged with La Ciotat and La Seyne-sur-Mer to form Normed.
In 1986 1,500 employees were put on leave, and "early retirement" was set at three years.
On 15 April 1987 the train ferry Nord-Pas-de-Calais was launched. 
It finally left the shipyard on 15 January 1988.
The remaining assets were sold at auction, and by 1989 all the cranes had been removed.

The Fonds régionaux d’art contemporain (Frac) Nord-Pas de Calais, a center for international contemporary art, is located in a new building erected beside the AP2, which still stands as a monument to the shipbuilding era.

Notable ships

 Destroyer Bourrasque. Launched, 5 August 1925; sunk, 30 May 1940
 Destroyer L'Adroit. Launched, 1 April 1927; sunk, 25 May 1940
 Destroyer . Launched, 16 April 1934; decommissioned, 6 December 1954
 Destroyer Lion. Scuttled, 27 November, 1942
 Destroyer Vauban. Scuttled, 27 November 1942
 Cape Ducato-class vehicle cargo ships
 Adolphe. Launched, 23 March 1902; wrecked on 30 September 1904
 SS Jacques Cartier, later named SS Winnipeg. Completed, 1918; torpedoed and sunk, 22 October 1942
 SS Athos. In service, 28 November 1915; torpedoed and sunk, 17 February 1917
 SS Cambodge, later named SS Stella Solaris. Launched, 28 June 1949; out of service, 1971
 SS Viet-Nam. Launched, 14 October 1951; destroyed by fire, 12 May 1974
 SS Flandre. Launched, 31 October 1951; destroyed by fire, 23 March 1994
 MS Pride of Telemark. Launched, 1983
 MS Stena Danica - Launched in 1983
 MS Nord Pas-de-Calais. Launched, 1987

Notes

Sources

French companies established in 1898
Dunkirk
Shipyards of France
1987 disestablishments in France